Teresa Albuquerque (née Moraes; 1930 – June 2017) was an Indian historian who specialised in the Goan diaspora and the colonial history of Bombay.

Early life
Teresa Moraes was born in Pune, India, in 1930, in a notable Goan family. Her brother was the journalist Frank Moraes.

She obtained a BA Honours degree in English and French from St Xavier's College, Bombay, which she followed up with an MA and Ph.D. in history from the University of Bombay. She married Matthew Albuquerque.

Career
Albuquerque started as a teacher of English and History at high school. Following a stint on a panel that reviewed history books, she took up post-graduate studies in history. She then joined the Heras Institute of Indian History and Culture as a researcher.

On the encouragement of John Correia-Afonso, a director of the institute, she began to investigate the history of Goa. From this research came several books and articles, in particular Anjuna: Profile of a Village in Goa, which was her husband's native village, as well as Goa: The Rachol Legacy, on the four hundred years of a Jesuit seminary in Goa. Her interest in colonial art and architecture resulted in the publication of Under the Archangel's Wings: 400 years of St.Michael’s Church, Anjuna

With a scholarship from the Heras Institute, she studied the Goan diaspora, publishing a book Goans in Kenya. Until the 1960s, east Africa had been a major centre of Goan migration. This book became an important source book for succeeding researchers.

Albuquerque published several works on the colonial history of India, especially on the intersection of Portuguese and British rules. Following the 1878 treaty between Britain and Portugal, the Goan economy became subject to British control. Commodities flowed into British India while the Portuguese raised taxes in Goa to compensate for the loss of revenue. A newly built railway line connecting Goa to British India then became a conduit for impoverished economic migrants heading to Bombay. Albuquerque's book on Goan emigres to British India, Goan Pioneers in Bombay (2011) covered their story; a paper The Anglo-Portuguese Treaty of 1878: Its impact on the people of Goa (1990) discussed the broader impact of the treaty on Goan lives.

A popular career taken up by Goans was of music-making, either joining street bands or orchestras in Bombay. Albuquerque reported that there was so much demand for Goan musicians that one entrepreneur named Francisco Menezes sought unemployed men to march in processions, inflating their cheeks without blowing a note. Another career was of bakery, with many such establishments appearing in Bandra, a neighbourhood of Mumbai. According to Albuquerque, this was an early settlement for Goan migrants, from the 1920s. Their skill of making bread translated into a nickname the Goans were given by the other residents of the city - Pao, from the Portuguese word pão for bread.

Another of her works was on the contributions of Christians to the Indian independence movement, The Role of Christians in the National Struggle for Freedom (2006)

Later life
Albuquerque died in June 2017 in Mumbai, aged 87.

Works

Books

Articles

References 

1930 births
2017 deaths
Indian women historians
Writers from Pune
University of Mumbai alumni
St. Xavier's College, Mumbai alumni
Women writers from Maharashtra
20th-century Indian historians
21st-century Indian historians
20th-century Indian women writers
20th-century Indian writers
21st-century Indian women writers
21st-century Indian writers
Women educators from Maharashtra
Educators from Maharashtra
Moraes family